Low Blows is the debut studio album by Australian singer-songwriter, Meg Mac. The album was recorded in Texas in the US and Victoria, Australia. It was released on 14 July 2017.

Mac said she wanted to aim for a live sound: "A lot of the vocal performances are live and unedited. It is hard to leave mistakes on a record but I think it was important to do that."

At the J Awards of 2017, the album was nominated for Australian Album of the Year.

Track listing
 "Grace Gold" – 3:48
 "Low Blows" – 3:32
 "Kindness" – 3:23
 "Cages" – 3:42
 "Didn't Wanna Get So Low But I Had To" – 3:51
 "Ride It" – 4:05
 "Maybe It's My First Time" – 3:33
 "Shiny Bright" – 3:20
 "Brooklyn Apartment (It's Louder Than the TV and the Radio)" – 3:19
 "Morning" – 1:39
 "Every Lie" (acoustic live) – 3:25 (pre-order only)
 "Never Be" (acoustic live) – 3:51 (pre-order only)
 "Saint Philomene" (acoustic live) – 4:16 (pre-order only)

Charts

Release history

References

2017 debut albums
Meg Mac albums